The American College of Medical Toxicology is a professional association of medical toxicologists that was founded in 1993. Its aim is to support quality medical care for persons exposed to potentially harmful chemicals (whether medications, drugs of abuse, workplace or environmental toxins, or bioterrorism agents), and to provide training and insight to the physicians who provide this care.

History

Timeline of the organization:
 1974: American Board of Medical Toxicology (ABMT) established
 1992: Medical Toxicology recognized by American Board of Medical Specialties
 1993: ABMT goes out of business and is replaced by ACMT and the Subboard of Medical Toxicology. Subboard members include representatives appointed by the American Board of Emergency Medicine, American Board of Pediatrics, and the American Board of Preventive Medicine
 1993: ACMT is incorporated as stand alone professional organization for physician toxicologists board certified in medical toxicology
 1994: Subboard offers first certification examination in Medical Toxicology 
 2001: Accreditation Council for Graduate Medical Education accredits Medical Toxicology fellowship training programs
 2002: First ACMT Annual Spring Conference
 2003: ACMT/Agency for Toxic Substances and Disease Registry Regional Consultation Network is established
 2004: First of over 50 courses a Chemical Agents of Opportunity offered with sponsorship of the ATSDR
 2004: First biannual ACMT Board Review Course offered
 2005: Publication of the Journal of Medical Toxicology
 2009: Establishment of the Medical Toxicology Foundation

Activities
The organization maintains the Toxicology Investigators Consortium database that catalogs HIPAA-compliant data regarding the clinical management of poisoned patients.

Journal 
The ACMT publishes the peer-reviewed medical journal Journal of Medical Toxicology.

References

External links
 

Health care-related professional associations based in the United States
Scientific organizations established in 1993